CD153 (cluster of differentiation 153) also known as tumor necrosis factor ligand superfamily member 8 is a protein that in humans is encoded by the TNFSF8 gene.

CD153 is a cytokine ligand for the TNF receptor CD30.  It plays a role in the  T cell-dependent anti-mycobacterial immune response.

References

External links